Yellow jasmine or wild yellow jasmine is a common name for several plants and may refer to:

 Gelsemium sempervirens, native to tropical and warm temperate regions of the Americas
 Jasminum humile, native to Asia and naturalized in Europe
 Jasminum mesnyi, native to Vietnam and southern China and naturalized in North America
 Pittosporum revolutum, native to Australia